The 1996–97 Arizona Wildcats men's basketball team represented the University of Arizona. The head coach was Lute Olson. The team played its home games in the McKale Center, and was a member of the Pacific-10 Conference.

After going 11–7 in conference play the team was seeded fourth in the Southeast Region of the 1997 NCAA tournament.  They went on to win the national championship, the first in program history, defeating three top-seeded teams in the process.

Roster

Schedule

|-
!colspan=9 style="background:#; color:white;"| Regular season

|-
!colspan=9 style="background:#;"| NCAA tournament

Rankings

Awards and honors

NCAA Tournament, Champions

Team players drafted into the NBA

Notes

References

Arizona Wildcats men's basketball seasons
NCAA Division I men's basketball tournament Final Four seasons
Arizona
NCAA Division I men's basketball tournament championship seasons
Arizona
Arizona Wildcats
Arizona Wildcats